865 Zubaida  is an elongated, stony background asteroid from the inner regions of the asteroid belt. It was named after Zobeide, a character in the opera Abu Hassan by Carl Maria von Weber (1786–1826).

Orbit and classification 

Zubaida is a non-family asteroid of the main belt's background population when applying the hierarchical clustering method to its proper orbital elements. It orbits the Sun in the inner asteroid belt at a distance of 1.9–2.9 AU once every 3 years and 9 months (1,373 days; semi-major axis of 2.42 AU). Its orbit has an eccentricity of 0.19 and an inclination of 13° with respect to the ecliptic.

Naming 

This minor planet was named after the character Zobeide, the Caliph's wife in the opera Abu Hassan by German composer Carl Maria von Weber (1786–1826). The official  was also mentioned in The Names of the Minor Planets by Paul Herget in 1955. Another asteroid, 866 Fatme, was also named after one of the characters of this opera. The composer himself was honored with the naming of 4152 Weber.

Physical characteristics 

In the SDSS-based taxonomy (MOC), Zubaida is an uncommon L-type asteroid, while in the Masi Foglia Binzel (MFB) taxonomic variant, it is a common, stony S-type asteroid.

Rotation period 

In January 2007, a rotational lightcurve of Zubaida was obtained from photometric observations by Colin Bembrick at the Mount Tarana Observatory  and Greg Crawford at Bagnall Beach Observatory  in collaboration with two other Australian observers. Lightcurve analysis gave a well-defined rotation period of  hours with a brightness variation of  magnitude. The observers also estimate an axial ratio (a/b) of 1.42 for the asteroid. An alternative observation during January 2007, by David Higgins and Julian Oey at Hunters Hill  and Leura  observatories, respectively, gave a concurring period  hours with an amplitude of  magnitude.

Diameter and albedo 

The Collaborative Asteroid Lightcurve Link assumes a standard albedo for a stony asteroid of 0.20 and calculates a diameter of 13.58 kilometers based on an absolute magnitude of 11.7.

Notes

References

External links 
 Lightcurve Database Query (LCDB), at www.minorplanet.info
 Dictionary of Minor Planet Names, Google books
 Asteroids and comets rotation curves, CdR – Geneva Observatory, Raoul Behrend
 Discovery Circumstances: Numbered Minor Planets (1)-(5000) – Minor Planet Center
 
 

000865
Discoveries by Max Wolf
Named minor planets
19170215